Dhebra is an Indian bread from the Gujarati cuisine made of pearl millet flour. When flavoured with fenugreek leaf, it's called methi dhebra.

Preparation 
To create dhebra, sufficient water and salt is mixed in millet flour to make a dough. The resulting dough balls are then flattened on a chakla to a round shape using a belan (rolling pin). Then, both sides of the dhebra are streamed with vegetable oil on a tava, until small brown spots appear.

This is a plain dhebra, made of millet flour (bajra atta). Because it is the simplest dhebra to make, it is the most commonly consumed in India. Another variety is the methi dhebra, in which methi (fenugreek) is added as flavour.

Flavour 
Fenugreek, Garlic, Guardian, Bottle Gourd, Cummin

See also 
Gujarati cuisine

References

External links
Methi Na Dhebra Tarla Dalal website

Indian cuisine
Gujarati cuisine